The 2009–10 Major Indoor Soccer League was the sophomore season for the league, and first under the revived MISL banner. It marked the 32nd season of professional Division 1 indoor soccer. The members of the MISL's second season teams were the Baltimore Blast, the Milwaukee Wave, the Monterrey La Raza, the Philadelphia KiXX, and the Rockford Rampage.

The season kicked off on November 13, 2009, with the NISL champion, Baltimore Blast, welcoming the Rockford Rampage. The regular season concluded on March 21, 2010, with the Rockford Rampage hosting Monterrey La Raza.

This year also marks the first season since the KiXX founding that they would play at a new arena, the Liacouras Center, on the campus of Temple University.

Shortly before the season began, the league was re-branded as the Major Indoor Soccer League.

The season for each team was expanded to twenty games, so each team was to play ten home and ten away games. However, due to arena conflicts with Temple University, the Kixx played eight home games and twelve road games.

On March 9, 2010, with an 11-6 win over the Rockford Rampage, the Milwaukee Wave clinched the first playoff spot, continuing the Wave's tradition of making the playoffs every season in a league named MISL. This also marks the fifteenth season since the 1993–1994 NPSL for the Wave to qualify for the playoffs.

Results table

Standings

Blue indicates bye into the MISL Championship
Green indicates playoff berth clinched

Scoring leaders

GP = Games Played, G = Goals, A = Assists, Pts = Points

Player of the Week

Players of the Month

End of Year Awards

All-Rookie Team

1st-Team All-MISL

2nd-Team All-MISL

Playoffs
The format for the playoffs is the same as the 2008–09 NISL format. The first place team in the season will get a bye into the finals, while the second and third place teams play a two-game, home-and-home, series, with a third golden goal game taking place at the second place team's home if needed.

Semifinals
Game 1

Game 2

Championship

References

External links
 Major Indoor Soccer League

Major Indoor Soccer League
Major Indoor Soccer League (2008–2014) seasons
Major
Major